Harry Warren "Rip" Collins (February 26, 1896 – May 27, 1968) was an American Major League Baseball pitcher with the New York Yankees, Boston Red Sox, Detroit Tigers and the St. Louis Browns between 1920 and 1931. Collins batted and threw right-handed.

Collins was born in the small city of Weatherford, Texas, a longtime seat of Parker County. Attending Texas A&M University, Collins was a four-sport star, chiefly known for his ability as a football punter.

In 1919, Collins became a starting pitcher for Double-A Dallas Rangers of the Texas League. A year later, he joined the New York Yankees.

Collins was a 14-game winner three times during his majors career, in his 1920 rookie season with the Yankees, for the Boston Red Sox in 1922, and with the Detroit Tigers in 1924. A member of the 1921 American League champion Yankees team, he relieved in Game Three of the World Series won by the New York Giants in seven games. He finished his major league career with the St. Louis Browns in 1931.

Rip and his former Texas A&M Aggie teammate Topper Rigney both played together for the Detroit Tigers from 1923 to 1925.

In an 11-season career, Collins posted a 108–82 record with 569 strikeouts and a 3.99 ERA in 1711.1 innings pitched.

Collins returned to the Texas League in 1933 to play one season with Fort Worth Cats and then retired from baseball.

Following his playing career Collins joined the Texas Ranger Division. He was elected Travis County sheriff in 1940 and served for eight years. Then became police chief of the Brazos County city of Bryan in 1950 and retired from law enforcement work in 1959. In  the first years of Little League Baseball in Bryan, Chief Collins was one of the first managers.

Collins died in Bryan at the age of 72.

External links

Rip Collins at SABR (Baseball BioProject)
Rip Collins at Baseball Library
Handbook of Texas

Boston Red Sox players
Detroit Tigers players
New York Yankees players
St. Louis Browns players
Major League Baseball pitchers
Texas A&M Aggies football players
Texas A&M Aggies baseball players
Members of the Texas Ranger Division
Texas sheriffs
American police chiefs
People from Weatherford, Texas
People from Bryan, Texas
Baseball players from Texas
1896 births
1968 deaths
Toronto Maple Leafs (International League) players
Fort Worth Cats players
20th-century American politicians